The Facetious Nights of Straparola (1550–1555; Italian: Le piacevoli notti), also known as The Nights of Straparola, is a two-volume collection of 75 stories by Italian author and fairy-tale collector Giovanni Francesco Straparola. Modeled after Boccaccio's Decameron, it is significant as often being called the first European storybook to contain fairy-tales; it would influence later fairy-tale authors like Charles Perrault and Jacob and Wilhelm Grimm.

History
The Facetious Nights of Straparola was first published in Italy between 1550–53 under the title Le piacevoli notti ("The Pleasant Nights") containing 74 stories. In 1555 the stories were published in a single volume in which one of the tales was replaced with two new tales, bringing the total to 75. Straparola was translated into Spanish in 1583. In 1624 it was placed on the Index of Prohibited Books.

The work was modeled on Boccaccio's Decameron with a frame narrative and novellas, but it took an innovative approach by also including folk and fairy tales. In the frame narrative, participants of a party on the island of Murano, near Venice, tell each other stories that vary from bawdy to fantastic. The narrators are mostly women, while the men, among whose ranks are included historical men of letters such as Pietro Bembo and Bernardo Cappello, listen.  The 74 original tales are told over 13 nights, five tales are told each night except the eighth (six tales) and the thirteenth (thirteen tales). Songs and dances begin each night, and the nights end with a riddle or enigma. The tales include folk and fairy-tales (about 15); Boccaccio-like novellas with themes of trickery and intrigue; and tragic and heroic stories.

The 15 fairy tales were influential with later authors, some were the first recorded instances of now-famous stories, like "Puss in Boots". Many of the tales were later collected or retold in Giambattista Basile’s The Tale of Tales (1634–36) and Jacob and Wilhelm Grimm's Grimm's Fairy Tales (1812–15).

Fairy tales
Fairy tales that originally appeared in Nights of Straparola, with later adaptations by Giambattista Basile, Madame d'Aulnoy, Charles Perrault, Carlo Gozzi, Jacob and Wilhelm Grimm.

1.2, “Cassandrino” (Grimms’ "The Master Thief")
1.3, “Pre Scarpacifico” (Grimms’ "Little Farmer")
1.4, “Tebaldo and Doralice” (related to Basile's "The Bear"; Charles Perrault's "Donkeyskin"; the Grimms’ "All-Fur" or All-Kinds-of-Fur)
2.1, “The Pig King” (d'Aulnoy's "Prince Marcassin", Grimms’ "Hans My Hedgehog")
3.1, “Crazy Peter” (Basile's "Peruonto"; d'Aulnoy's "The Dolphin"; Grimms’ "Simple Hans")
3.2, “Livoretto” (Basile's Corvetto; Aulnoy's "The Story of Pretty Goldilocks" and Grimm's Ferdinand the Faithful and Ferdinand the Unfaithful)
3.3, “Biancabella and the Snake” (elements of Basile's "Penta With the Chopped-Off Hands" and "The Two Little Pizzas")
3.4, “Fortunio” (elements of the Grimms’ "The Nixie in the Pond")
4.1, “Costanza / Costanzo” (d'Aulnoy's "Belle-Belle ou Le Chevalier Fortuné", Grimms’ "How Six Made Their Way in the World")
4.3, “Ancilotto, King of Provino” (Grimms’ "The Three Little Birds"; d'Aulnoy's "Princess Belle-Etoile"; Carlo Gozzi's "The Green Bird"; Crane's "The Dancing Water, the Singing Apple, and the Speaking Bird")
5.1, “Guerrino and the Savage Man” (Grimms’ "Iron Hans")
5.2, “Adamantina” (Basile's "The Goose"; Grimms’ "The Golden Goose")
7.5, “The Three Brothers” (Basile's "The Five Sons"; Grimms’ "The Four Skillful Brothers")
8.5, “Maestro Lattantio and His Apprentice Dionigi” (Grimms’ "The Thief and His Master")
10.3, “Cesarino di Berni” (Basile's "The Merchant"; Grimms’ "The Two Brothers")
11.1, “Costantino Fortunato” (Basile's "Cagliuso"; Perrault's "Puss in Boots")

Footnotes

References

Further reading
Ruth B. Bottigheimer, Fairy Godfather: Straparola, Venice, and the Fairy Tale Tradition (University of Pennsylvania Press, 2002).

External links

The Nights of Straparola, trans. W.G.Waters 1894. Scanned original color illustrated editions.
The Italian Novelists (vol. 1–4), trans. W.G.Waters 1901–04. Scanned original color illustrated editions. Note: this edition differs slightly in content from the 1894 edition.
SurLaLune Fairy Tale Pages: The Facetious Nights of Straparola

Collections of fairy tales